Aenigmachanna gollum, the Gollum snakehead, is a species of aquifer-dwelling dragon snakehead fish that is endemic to the Indian state of Kerala.

Description 
A. gollum has an elongated, eel-like body coloured mostly brown and beige. Its fins are long and transparent, with the dorsal fin stretching for about three-quarters of its body length, and the anal fin stretching for more than half its body length. Its pectoral fin is large, while the pelvic fin is absent. Its tailfin is ovoid. Several large scales cover the top of the head. It has a reduced swim bladder.

Unlike many stygofauna - which usually have reduced colouring and have poor or no vision - A. gollum has well-developed pigmentation and normally-sized eyes.

Due to its reduced swim bladder, A. gollum cannot remain buoyant in water. Like other snakehead fishes, it breathes air. It moves by undulating its fins, like an eel.

Distribution and habitat 
A. gollum is known only from its type locality, a paddy field in Oorakam, Kerala, in the biodiverse Western Ghats; one other occurrence was reported in a well 250 km south of the type locality. Its habitat in subterranean aquifers is threatened by about six million groundwater wells in the region, which lower the water table.

Etymology
A. gollum is named after the cave-dwelling character Gollum from J. R. R. Tolkien's The Hobbit and The Lord of the Rings book series, as a reference to both A. gollum and Gollum being former surface-dwellers that evolved to adapt to the caves they lived in. The genus Aenigmachanna was raised for the first time on discovery of A. gollum, with aenigma meaning "enigma" in Latin, and Channa being the generic name of Asian snakehead fishes.

Taxonomy 

A. gollum was the first discovered species of the genus Aenigmachanna. The genus was first placed in the true snakehead fish family Channidae.

A. gollum was placed in a separate genus because of significant physiological and genetic differences between itself and the other genera in Channidae - Parachanna and Channa. A. gollum has an unusually long dorsal fin, anal fin and vertebral column compared to Parachanna and Channa, and also has a more eel-like body. Unlike the other channids, it also lacks pored scales on the lateral line, which normally carry the lateral-line canal, and has more vertebrae lacking ribs. The other channids also have a longer swim bladder.

In 2020, Aenigmachanna was placed in its own monotypic family, the Aenigmachannidae, or the dragon snakeheads.

Discovery
A. gollum was discovered as a result of the 2018 Kerala floods, when several individuals were washed out of their aquifer habitat and into a paddy field in Oorakam, where they were found and photographed by a resident of the village, who posted the pictures on social media. The pictures were noticed by Rajeev Raghavan from the Kerala University of Fisheries and Ocean Studies, who prompted a study into the species. It was described in 2019. It is the eighth species of fish known from the Kerala aquifers, indicating the presence of a large, hidden ecosystem in the hard-to-study habitat.

See also 
 Gollum (genus), another taxon of fish named after Gollum

References 

Fish described in 2019
gollum
Cave fish
Fauna of Kerala
Freshwater fish of India
Endemic fauna of India
Taxa named by Ralf Britz, 
Taxa named by V.K. Anoop, 
Taxa named by Neelesh Dahanukar
Taxa named by Rajeev Raghavan
Organisms named after Tolkien and his works